Dmitry Savelyev or Dmitry Saveliev may refer to:

 Dmitry Savelyev (politician, born 1968), Russian politician
 Dmitry Savelyev (politician, born 1971), Russian politician
 Dmitry Saveliev (pair skater), Russian pair skater
  (born 1979), Russian bandy player
  (1906—1965), Soviet organizer of industrial production and party activist